Unmarried is a 1920 British silent drama film directed by Rex Wilson and starring Gerald du Maurier, Malvina Longfellow and Edmund Gwenn. The film portrays an unmarried mother and the social workers who support her.

Partial cast
 Gerald du Maurier - Reverend Roland Allington
 Malvina Longfellow - Jenny Allington
 Edmund Gwenn - Simm Vandeleur
 Mary Glynne - Vivien Allington
 Hayford Hobbs - Cyril Myles
 Mary Rorke - Prudence
 Arthur Walcott - Sir John Allington
 Constance Backner - Mary Myles
 Annie Esmond - Miss Pringle
 Vivian Palmer - Cyril Morley
 Ralph Forster - Harker

References

External links

1920 films
1920 drama films
Films directed by Rex Wilson
British drama films
British silent feature films
British black-and-white films
1920s English-language films
1920s British films
Silent drama films